Carmen Consuelo Cerezo (née Vargas, born August 22, 1940) is a former United States district judge of the United States District Court for the District of Puerto Rico. Cerezo is the first Latina to serve on a federal bench, and the first female federal judge in Puerto Rico. At the time of her retirement in 2021, Cerezo was the last federal judge in active service to have been appointed to her position by President Jimmy Carter.

Education and career

Born in San Juan, Puerto Rico, Cerezo received a Bachelor of Arts degree, summa cum laude, from University of Puerto Rico in 1963, a Juris Doctor from University of Puerto Rico School of Law in 1966, and a Master of Laws from University of Virginia School of Law in 1988. She was in private practice in Puerto Rico for only eight months between 1966 and 1967 before being appointed chief law clerk for the Chief Justice of the Supreme Court of Puerto Rico, Luis Negron Fernandez. After one year under Chief Justice Fernandez, Cerezo became a law clerk for the United States District Court for the District of Puerto Rico, maintaining that position from 1967 to 1972. She was a judge of the Superior Court of the Commonwealth of Puerto Rico from 1972 to 1976, and of the Court of Intermediate Appeals of the Commonwealth of Puerto Rico from 1976 to 1980.

Federal judicial service

On May 14, 1980, President Jimmy Carter nominated Cerezo to a new seat on the United States District Court for the District of Puerto Rico created by 92 Stat. 1629. She was confirmed by the United States Senate on June 26, 1980, and received her commission on June 30, 1980. She served as Chief Judge from 1993 to 1999. Cerezo retired from active service on February 28, 2021.

Notable rulings

In the 2015 Colón-Marrero v. Conty-Pérez decision, Cerezo ruled that purging Puerto Rican voters who did not vote in an election from the register of eligible voters violated the National Voter Registration Act, the Help Americans Vote Act, and the first and fourteenth amendments to the United States Constitution.

On March 28, 2018, Cerezo ruled in Arroyo v. Rosselló that Puerto Rico must allow transgender people to change their gender marker on their birth certificate. In her opinion, Cerezo wrote,The right to identify our own existence lies at the heart of one’s humanity. And so, we must heed their voices: ‘the woman that I am,’ ‘the man that I am.’ Plaintiffs know they are not fodder for memoranda legalese. They have stepped up for those whose voices, debilitated by raw discrimination, have been hushed into silence. They cannot wait for another generation, hoping for a lawmaker to act. They, like Linda Brown, took the steps to the courthouse to demand what is due: their right to exist, to live more and die less.In August 2018, Cerezo ordered Mora Development Corp. to pay $3 million for a Clean Water Act violation after the corporation discharged more than 29 million gallons of sewage into the municipal stormwater system and into Quilan Creek as well as discharging sewage into the La Plata River without proper treatment.

Personal

She was married to Benny Frankie Cerezo, an attorney, former state legislator and political analyst until his death on April 15, 2013, and is the mother of one son, a partner in a Miami law firm, and one daughter.

See also

 List of first women lawyers and judges in the United States
 List of Hispanic/Latino American jurists
 List of Puerto Ricans
 History of women in Puerto Rico

Notes

References

External links
 

1940 births
Living people
Puerto Rican lawyers
Hispanic and Latino American judges
Judges of the United States District Court for the District of Puerto Rico
Puerto Rican judges
United States district court judges appointed by Jimmy Carter
20th-century American judges
University of Puerto Rico alumni
University of Virginia School of Law alumni
21st-century American judges
20th-century American women judges
21st-century American women judges